Pantydia capistrata is a moth of the family Erebidae. It is found in Fiji, New Guinea and Australia, including New South Wales and Queensland.

Description
The wingspan is about 40 mm. Adults are fawn. There is an orange line running parallel to the margin of each forewing. The hindwings have a broad dark edge. Males have a swelling on each antenna.

The larvae feed on the leaves of soy beans. They are brown with a darker strip down the middle of the back and two transverse black bands. They reach a length of 35–40 mm.

References

Moths described in 1894
Pantydia